4th Regiment of Horse or 4th Horse may refer to:

 3rd Dragoon Guards, ranked as 4th Horse from 1685 to 1746
 7th Dragoon Guards, ranked as 4th (Irish) Horse from 1746 to 1788
 4th Horse (Hodson's Horse)